Michelle Cruz Skinner (born 1965) is a Philippine-born educator and writer living in Hawaii.

The daughter of an American father from Indiana and a Filipino mother from Manila, she was born in Rizal and spent her formative years at the Subic Bay Naval Base before moving to Honolulu in 1983. She was educated at the University of Hawaii and Arizona State University and went on to teach at Punahou School in Honolulu. Her story  "Faith Healer" was included in the 7th Annual PEN Syndicated Fiction Project in 1988. Her second book Mango Seasons was nominated for the 1996 Philippine National Book Award.

Selected works 
Balikbayan, short stories (1986)
Mango Seasons, short stories (1996)
 In the Company of Strangers, short stories (2009)

References 

1955 births
Living people
Filipino emigrants to the United States
American women short story writers
American writers of Filipino descent
Filipino people of American descent
Filipino women short story writers
Filipino short story writers
University of Hawaiʻi alumni
20th-century American women writers
21st-century American women writers
Arizona State University alumni
20th-century American short story writers
21st-century American short story writers